Two warships of Japan have been named Isuzu:

 , a  launched in 1921 and sunk in 1945
 , an  launched in 1961 and stricken in 1992

Japanese Navy ship names